Dehnow Aligar (also Romanized as Dehnow Alīgar; also known as Deh Now) is a village in Borborud-e Gharbi Rural District, in the Central District of Aligudarz County, Lorestan Province, Iran. At the 2006 census, its population was 166, in 24 families.

References 

Towns and villages in Aligudarz County